Communication University of Zhejiang (CUZ), also known as Zhejiang University of Media and Communications (ZUMC), is a public national university in Hangzhou, China. It is a teaching and research institution specializing in journalism, broadcasting, radio and television, cinematography, advertising, new media and social media. ZUMC is known as one of the leading universities in media and communication in China, and shares the fame with Communication University of China for cultivating professionals, talents and specialists in the industry.

History 
Communication University of Zhejiang is a national university in China. CUZ was formerly known as the Zhejiang Higher Vocational Training School of Radio & Television which was affiliated with the State Administration of Radio Film and Television.

In May 2004, with the approval of the Ministry of Education, the school was upgraded to a university and changed its name to Zhejiang University of Media and Communications. In October 2011, the Ministry of Education granted the university the right to confer master's degrees in Journalism and Media Communications.

Today, nearly 10,000 full-time students are studying in over 50 programs at the 13 colleges and schools of ZUMC.

Campuses 
CUZ has two campuses in the Hangzhou area. The main campus, located in the Xiasha Higher Education Zone, is 52 hectares with a floor space of 450,000 square metres.  60 kilometers to the east of the Xiasha Campus, is the Tongxiang campus, which is over 33 hectares with a floor space of 160,000 square metres.

Schools and Colleges 
CUZ is divided into the following schools and colleges:

 The School of Broadcasting Arts
 The School of Electronics and Information
 The School of Animation
 The School of Management
 The School of Cultures & Communications
 The School of Art Design
 The School of Cultural Creativity
 The School of Literature
 The School of New Media
 The School of Journalism and Communications
 College of Music
 College of Film & TV Arts
 College of Continuing Education
 Foreign Languages Teaching Centre
 Department of College Physical Education
 Department of Social Sciences & Teaching

Facilities 
Valued at 180 million RMB, CUZ is equipped with advanced teaching and experimental facilities that provide students with a professional, efficient and people-friendly learning environment. CUZ has five experimental teaching model centres and 21 laboratories, including one for Announcing & Presenting with Broadcast Directing Practice and one for Special Digital Effects. The 22-storey multi-functional Media Tower houses 17 broadcasting studios of various sizes has been a production base for broadcasting radio and television programmes, teaching/research activities and social services. CUZ's library, with a collection of 960,000 books on various subjects, 750,000 E-books and about 50,000 audio-visual items, has become a regional resource centre for radio and television study and research.

International partnerships 
CUZ has partners in the UK, USA, Australia, New Zealand, Canada, Sweden, South Korea, France, Germany, Italy and other areas and countries. Over 40 institutions of higher learning internationally have established cooperation with CUZ in student/teacher exchange projects, short-term visits, teacher training, various joint-programmes and other international academic activities.

The Confucius Institute 
In July 2011, CUZ and Ulster University developed the Confucius Institute at Ulster University in Coleraine, Northern Ireland. The Confucius Institute is part of a network of 322 institutes in over 50 countries which promote and teach Chinese language and culture and facilitate cultural exchanges aimed at fostering trade links with China.

Center for Internet and Society 
Fang Xingdong is the Director and Jeff Yang is the Secretary of the Center for Internet and Society at CUZ.

References 

Universities and colleges in Hangzhou
Film schools in China
Journalism schools in Asia
Educational institutions established in 1984
1984 establishments in China